José Santiago Bueso (1815–1857) was President of Honduras from 18 October to 8 November 1855.

He served as Vice President of Honduras in the cabinet of José Trinidad Cabañas from 1852 to 1855.

References 

Presidents of Honduras
Vice presidents of Honduras
1857 deaths
1815 births